Mentone is a census-designated place in San Bernardino County, California, United States. The population was 7,803 at the 2000 census and 8,720 at the 2010 census.

There is a good selection of housing developments (which has been slowly increasing over the past years), as well as bars, churches, and restaurants. California State Route 38 serves as its main street, being called Mentone Boulevard upon entering the Mentone district from Redlands on the west side, then changes to Mill Creek Road on the east side of the district. The road through Mentone serves as one of three gateways to the San Bernardino Mountains (especially the small community of Angelus Oaks and the mountainous city of Big Bear Lake).

History
Mentone is a former railroad town and health spa. It was named for Menton, France. A map for the Mentone townsite was filed on February 24, 1888.

Demographics

2010
At the 2010 census Mentone had a population of 8,720. The racial makeup of Mentone was 6,114 (70.1%) White (52.4% non-Hispanic White), 438 (5.0%) African American, 122 (1.4%) Native American, 352 (4.0%) Asian, 32 (0.4%) Pacific Islander, 1,234 (14.2%) from other races, and 428 (4.9%) from two or more races. Hispanic or Latino people of any race were 3,085 persons (35.4%).

The census reported that 8,601 people (98.6% of the population) lived in households, 64 (0.7%) lived in non-institutionalized group quarters, and 55 (0.6%) were institutionalized.

There were 3,026 households, 1,239 (40.9%) had children under the age of 18 living in them, 1,442 (47.7%) were opposite-sex married couples living together, 513 (17.0%) had a female householder with no husband present, 204 (6.7%) had a male householder with no wife present.  There were 222 (7.3%) unmarried opposite-sex partnerships, and 24 (0.8%) same-sex married couples or partnerships. 674 households (22.3%) were one person and 180 (5.9%) had someone living alone who was 65 or older. The average household size was 2.84.  There were 2,159 families (71.3% of households); the average family size was 3.31.

The age distribution was 2,333 people (26.8%) under the age of 18, 979 people (11.2%) aged 18 to 24, 2,344 people (26.9%) aged 25 to 44, 2,263 people (26.0%) aged 45 to 64, and 801 people (9.2%) who were 65 or older.  The median age was 33.7 years. For every 100 females, there were 97.3 males.  For every 100 females age 18 and over, there were 95.4 males.

There were 3,273 housing units at an average density of 525.0 per square mile, of the occupied units 1,844 (60.9%) were owner-occupied and 1,182 (39.1%) were rented. The homeowner vacancy rate was 2.7%; the rental vacancy rate was 8.3%.  5,371 people (61.6% of the population) lived in owner-occupied housing units and 3,230 people (37.0%) lived in rental housing units.

During 2009–2013, Mentone had a median household income of $58,178, with 10.8% of the population living below the federal poverty line.

2000
At the 2000 census there were 7,803 people, 2,757 households, and 1,891 families. The population density was 1,252.7 inhabitants per square mile (483.6/km). The racial makeup was 74.5% White, 4.7% African American, 1.1% Native American, 3.0% Asian, 0.2% Pacific Islander, 12.4% from other races, and 4.1% from two or more races. Hispanic or Latino people of any race were 25.1%.

39.5% of the households in Mentone had children under the age of 18, 49.9% were married couples living together, 13.6% had a female head of the household, and 31.4% were non-families.  Of the 24.5% of households made up of individuals, 7.1% were 65 or older.  The average household size was 2.8 and the average family size was 3.3.

The age distribution was 30.7% under the age of 18, 9.9% from 18 to 24, 30.8% from 25 to 44, 19.7% from 45 to 64, and 9.0% 65 or older.  The median age was 32 years.  For every 100 females, there were 95.6 males.  For every 100 females age 18 and over, there were 91.9 males.

The median household income was $41,225, and the median family income  was $47,786.  Males had a median income of $40,888 versus $29,495 for females.  The per capita income for the CDP was $17,781.  About 8.8% of families and 10.4% of the population were below the poverty line, including 11.7% of those under age 18 and 1.5% of those age 65 or over.

Government

Local
Mentone is not incorporated and has no mayor or city council.  Its schools are part of the Redlands Unified School District. Police and fire services are provided by San Bernardino County (police services come from the Yucaipa Valley Station, with mutual aid assistance from the Redlands Police and Fire Departments). Property taxes are collected by San Bernardino County.

State and federal representation

References

External links
 
Mentone Chamber of Commerce - portal style website; government, business, library, recreation and more
City-Data.com - comprehensive statistical data and more about Tipton

Census-designated places in San Bernardino County, California
Populated places in San Bernardino County, California
Populated places on the Santa Ana River
Census-designated places in California